{{DISPLAYTITLE:2008 CK70}}

 (also written 2008 CK70) is an Apollo near-Earth asteroid. In 2013 it had the 7th highest impact threat on the Palermo Technical Impact Hazard Scale. It was discovered on 9 February 2008 by Lincoln Near-Earth Asteroid Research (LINEAR) at an apparent magnitude of 19 using a  reflecting telescope. Ten precovery images from January 2008 have been located. It was removed from the Sentry Risk Table on 21 December 2013. It may be possible to recover the asteroid in late September 2017, but it will have an apparent magnitude of about 22.

It has an observation arc of 35 days with an uncertainty parameter of 6. Perturbations by Earth and Venus will increase the orbital uncertainty over time. When the asteroid only had an observation arc of 5 days, virtual clones of the asteroid that fit the uncertainty region in the known trajectory showed a 1 in 2,700 chance that the asteroid could impact Earth on 14 February 2030. The power of such an air burst would be somewhere between the Chelyabinsk meteor and the Tunguska event depending on the actual size of the asteroid. Using the nominal orbit, JPL Horizons shows that the asteroid will be  from Earth on 14 February 2030.

References

External links 
 Canadian Astro Data Centre SSOIS: Solar Sys object image search 
 Lost NEOs (part 2): how to find them… online! / mpml #30423(02 Oct 2014)
 Fast method for the estimation of impact probability of near-Earth objects – Vavilov and Medvedev
 
 
 

Minor planet object articles (unnumbered)

20080209